Malti Maheshwari is a politician from Gujarat, India. She is a member of Bharatiya Janata Party. She was a member of 14th and 15th Gujarat Legislative Assembly from Gandhidham constituency.

References

Living people
People from Kutch district
Bharatiya Janata Party politicians from Gujarat
Women in Gujarat politics
Gujarat MLAs 2017–2022
Gujarat MLAs 2022–2027
21st-century Indian women politicians
21st-century Indian politicians
Year of birth missing (living people)